The Centre des arts Juliette-Lassonde is a cultural complex located in Saint-Hyacinthe, Quebec, Canada.

Cultural role  
Centre des arts Juliette-Lassonde is a major cultural site for the Monteregian region. It accommodates professional artists, the local arts community in performing arts, and the visual arts community. It is particularly important for the regional county municipality Les Maskoutains, whose population of 80,000 residents can take advantage of it.

Several artists with a national and international reputation have performed at the centre, including Salvatore Adamo, Gary Kurtz, Oliver Jones, Roch Voisine, André-Philippe Gagnon, Michel Rivard, l'Orchestre symphonique de Montréal, Stéphane Rousseau, Richard Desjardins, Zachary Richard, Claude Dubois, Isabelle Boulay, Jorane, Édith Butler, Richard Séguin, Angèle Dubeau, Pascale Picard Band, Vincent Vallières, Luce Dufault, Marco Calliari, and Kevin Parent.

Investment and construction 
The cost of the centre's construction grew to $12 million Canadian dollars. Funding was provided by both the Canadian federal and Québec provincial governments, together with the City of Saint-Hyacinthe, as well as private donations collected by a fundraising campaign. The technical equipment of the hall is among the best in terms of sound quality and technology in Québec.

History 
In 1990, the city of Saint-Hyacinthe performed surveys and consultations with the population. In 1998, the year of celebrations of the 250th anniversary of the founding of the city, the position paper "City of the twenty-first century" relaunched the idea of a centre for entertainment in the city centre, to meet the needs of local and regional cultural organizations. The construction of the complex was started in 2004, with the approval of the Ministry of Culture and Communications of Québec (MCCQ), and ended in December 2005.

The centre was named in honour of Juliette Lassonde, the mother of four famous children : 
 Pierre Lassonde, President of Newmont Mining, the largest gold producer in the world, who also gave his name to the Pavilions Lassonde of the École Polytechnique de Montréal 
 Judge Michel Lassonde, of the Civil Division of the Court of Quebec 
 Dr. Jean Lassonde, specialist at Hospital Maisonneuve-Rosemont 
 Louise Lassonde, a resident of Geneva, Switzerland. 
Juliette Lassonde was a food journalist for the newspaper Le Clairon, Le Courrier de Saint-Hyacinthe, and the "Journal Monday". She was a member of the International Federation of the press and gourmet wine-tourism and Circle member of the women journalists. Juliette Lassonde died April 9, 2005 at the age of 91.

External links 
 Official Website
 Virtual tour

Concert halls in Canada
Music venues in Quebec
Event venues established in 2005
Buildings and structures in Saint-Hyacinthe
Tourist attractions in Montérégie
Dan Hanganu buildings
Performing arts centres in Canada